The B83 is a variable-yield thermonuclear gravity bomb developed by the United States in the late 1970s that entered service in 1983. It was designed by Lawrence Livermore National Laboratory.

History
The B83 was based partly on the earlier B77 program, which was terminated because of cost overruns. The B77 was designed with an active altitude control and lifting parachute system for supersonic low-altitude delivery from the B-1A bomber. B77 nuclear component test firings were attributed to the Operation Anvil series in 1975 and 1976, specifically the "Cheese" test shots in Anvil:
 Anvil Kasseri – 28 October 1975,  (B77/B83 full yield)
 Anvil Muenster – 3 January 1976, 
 Anvil Fontina – 12 February 1976, 
 Anvil Colby – 14 May 1976, 
The B83 nuclear components have been attributed as the same as the earlier B77.

The B83 replaced several earlier weapons, including the B28, B43, and to some extent the ultra-high-yield B53. It was the first U.S. nuclear weapon designed from the start to avoid accidental detonation, with the use of "insensitive explosives" in the trigger lens system. Its layout is similar to that of the smaller B61, with the warhead mounted in the forward part of the weapon to make the bomb nose-heavy. It was intended for high-speed carriage (up to Mach 2.0) and delivery at high or low altitude. For the latter role, it is equipped with a parachute retardation system, with a  Kevlar ribbon parachute capable of rapid deceleration. It can be employed in free-fall, retarded, contact, and laydown modes, for air-burst or ground-burst detonation. Security features include next-generation permissive action link (PAL) and a command disablement system (CDS), rendering the weapon tactically useless without a nuclear yield.

The B83 was test fired in the Grenadier Tierra nuclear weapon test on 15 December 1984, at a reduced yield of 80 kilotonnes due to the Threshold Test Ban Treaty.

With the dismantling of the last B53 bomb in 2011, the B83 became the highest yield nuclear weapon in the U.S. arsenal. In 2022, Biden administration declared that they plan to retire B83.

Design
The location of the lifting lugs shows that the greater part of the total mass is contained in the nuclear explosive. The weapon is protected by a Category "D" Permissive Action Link (PAL) that prevents the enabling or detonation of the weapon without proper authorization.

About 650 B83s were built, and the weapon remains in service as part of the United States "Enduring Stockpile".

Aircraft capable of carrying the B83 
The following aircraft are certified for carrying the B83 bomb:
B-52 Stratofortress (formerly)
B-1B Lancer (formerly)
B-2 Spirit

Nuclear capability has been removed from the B-1B, and the B-52 no longer carries gravity nuclear bombs.

Novel uses
The B83 is one of the weapons considered for use in the "Nuclear Bunker Buster" project, which for a time was known as the Robust Nuclear Earth Penetrator, or RNEP. While most efforts have focused on the smaller B61-11 nuclear bomb, Los Alamos National Laboratory was also analyzing the use of the B83 in this role.

The physics package contained within the B83 has been studied for use in asteroid impact avoidance strategies against any seriously threatening near earth asteroids. Six such warheads, configured for the maximum , would be deployed by maneuvering space vehicles to "knock" an asteroid off course, should it pose a risk to the Earth.

See also
 B61 nuclear bomb
 List of nuclear weapons

References

External links

 B83 Information Site
 B83 page at nuclearweaponarchive.org

Cold War aerial bombs of the United States
Nuclear bombs of the United States
Military equipment introduced in the 1980s